Fakultet političkih nauka (Faculty of Political Sciences in most South Slavic languages) may refer to:
 University of Montenegro Faculty of Political Sciences, a university in Podgorica
 University of Belgrade Faculty of Political Sciences